Events from the year 1811 in the United States.

Incumbents

Federal Government 
 President: James Madison (DR-Virginia)
 Vice President: George Clinton (DR-New York)
 Chief Justice: John Marshall (Virginia)
 Speaker of the House of Representatives: Joseph Bradley Varnum (DR-Massachusetts) (until March 4), Henry Clay (DR-Kentucky) (starting November 4)
 Congress: 11th (until March 4), 12th (starting March 4)

Events
 January 8 – An unsuccessful slave revolt is led by Charles Deslandes in St. Charles and St. James, Louisiana.
 January 22 – The Casas Revolt begins in San Antonio, Texas.
 March 4 – The charter of the First Bank of the United States expires.
 March 22 – The Commissioners' Plan of 1811 for Manhattan is presented.
 July 9 – British explorer David Thompson posts a notice at the confluence of the Columbia and Snake Rivers (in modern-day Washington (state)) claiming the area for the United Kingdom.
 October 11 – Inventor John Stevens' boat, the Juliana, begins operation as the first steam-powered ferry (service between New York, New York, and Hoboken, New Jersey).
 November 7 – Battle of Tippecanoe: American troops led by William Henry Harrison defeat the Native American chief Tecumseh.
 December 16 – The New Madrid earthquake in Mississippi Valley near New Madrid reverses the course of the river for a while. Other earthquakes along the fault occur on January 23, 1812, and February 7, 1812.
 December 26 – The Richmond Theatre fire in Virginia kills 72 people including the Governor of Virginia George William Smith and the president of the First National Bank of Virginia Abraham B. Venable.

Births
 January 5 – James Charles, U.S. Senator from Pennsylvania from 1851 to 1857 (died 1863)
 January 6 – Charles Sumner, U.S. Senator from Massachusetts from 1851 to 1874 (died 1874)
 January 16 – William Alexander Richardson, U.S. Senator from Illinois from 1863 to 1865 (died 1875)
 January 17 – George S. Houston, Governor of Alabama from 1874 to 1878 and U.S. Senator from Alabama in 1879 (died 1879)
 February 3 – Horace Greeley, author and statesman, founder and editor of the New-York Tribune (died 1872)
 February 4 – Asa Biggs, U.S. Senator from North Carolina from 1855 to 1858 (died 1878)
 February 8 – Edwin D. Morgan, 21st Governor of New York from 1859-1862(died 1883)
 February 24
 Edward Dickinson Baker, English-born U.S. Senator from Oregon from 1860 to 1861 (died 1861)
 Henry Smith Lane, U.S. Senator from Indiana from 1861 to 1867 (died 1881)
 March 15 – Robert Allen, Union Army brigadier general (died 1886)
 March 20 – George Caleb Bingham, artist, soldier and politician (died 1879)
 August 6 – Judah P. Benjamin, U.S. Senator from Louisiana from 1853 to 1861, 1st Confederate States Attorney General, 2nd Confederate States Secretary of War, 3rd Confederate States Secretary of State (died 1884)
 June 14 – Harriet Beecher Stowe, abolitionist and author best known for the novel Uncle Tom's Cabin (died 1896)
 July 11 – Isaac A. Van Amburgh, animal trainer (died 1865)
 December 19 – Aaron Shaw, U.S. Representative from Illinois (died 1887)

Deaths
 June 19 – Samuel Chase, Associate Justice of the United States Supreme Court, signatory of the Declaration of Independence (born 1741)
 August 2 – William Williams, signatory of the Declaration of Independence (born 1731)

See also
Timeline of United States history (1790–1819)

Further reading
 
 D. Fedotoff White. A Russian Sketches Philadelphia, 1811–1813. The Pennsylvania Magazine of History and Biography, Vol. 75, No. 1 (January 1951), pp. 3–24
 Willard E. Wight, Robert J. Miller. The Journals of the Reverend Robert J. Miller, Lutheran Missionary in Virginia, 1811 and 1813. The Virginia Magazine of History and Biography, Vol. 61, No. 2 (April 1953), pp. 141–166
 Willard E. Wight. Two Lutheran Missionary Journals, 1811, 1813. The South Carolina Historical Magazine, Vol. 55, No. 1 (January 1954), pp. 6–14
 Florence G. Watts. Lieutenant Charles Larrabee's Account of the Battle of Tippecanoe, 1811. Indiana Magazine of History, Vol. 57, No. 3 (September 1961), pp. 225–247
 Donald R. Hickey. The Federalists and the Coming of the War, 1811–1812. Indiana Magazine of History, Vol. 75, No. 1 (March 1979), pp. 70–88
 Raymond W. Champagne Jr., Thomas J. Rueter. Jonathan Roberts and the "War Hawk" Congress of 1811–1812. The Pennsylvania Magazine of History and Biography, Vol. 104, No. 4 (October 1980), pp. 434–449
 Raymond H. Hammes. The Cantine Mounds of Southern Illinois: The First Published Report of Their Existence and an 1811 Eyewitness Account of the Monks Who Lived There. Journal of the Illinois State Historical Society, Vol. 74, No. 2 (Summer 1981), pp. 145–156
 Thomas Marshall Thompson. National Newspaper and Legislative Reactions to Louisiana's Deslondes Slave Revolt of 1811. Louisiana History: The Journal of the Louisiana Historical Association, Vol. 33, No. 1 (Winter 1992), pp. 5–29

External links
 

 
1810s in the United States
United States
United States
Years of the 19th century in the United States